Events in the year 1747 in Norway.

Incumbents
Monarch: Frederick V

Events

Arts and literature

Births
14 April - Peder Jørgen Cloumann, bailiff and representative at the Norwegian Constituent Assembly (died 1817)
17 November - Carsten Anker, businessman, civil servant and politician (died 1824)

Deaths

See also